Gwynfardd Brycheiniog (fl. c. 1170–80) was a Welsh-language poet.

Gwynfardd is noted for his eulogies in praise of Saint David and the Lord Rhys.

References
J Lloyd-Jones, 'The Court Poets of the Welsh Princes', Proceedings of the British Academy, 1948

12th-century deaths
Welsh-language poets
People from Powys
12th-century Welsh poets
Year of birth unknown
12th-century Welsh writers